Karman or Kármán is a Hungarian surname. Notable people with the surname include:

 Harvey Karman (20th century), inventor of the Karman cannula
 Janice Karman (born 1954), American film producer, record producer, singer, and voice artist
 József Kármán (1769–1795), sentimentalist Hungarian author
 Tawakkol Karman (born 1979), Yemeni journalist, politician, and human rights activist

See also 
 Theodore von Kármán (1881–1963), Hungarian-American engineer and physicist
Von Kármán (disambiguation)
 Karman cannula
 Kármán–Howarth equation
 Kármán line
 Kármán vortex street
 Kaman (disambiguation)
 Karmann
 Kerman (disambiguation)
 Carman (disambiguation)
 Karma (disambiguation)

Hungarian-language surnames